Kruisstraat may refer to several locations in the Dutch province of North Brabant:

Kruisstraat, 's-Hertogenbosch
Kruisstraat, Roosendaal
Kruisstraat, Halderberge